The New York City Public Design Commission, known legally as the Art Commission, is the agency of the New York City government that reviews permanent works of architecture, landscape architecture, and art proposed on or over city-owned property.

The Art Commission comprises 11 members who, by law, must include an architect, a landscape architect, a painter, a sculptor, and three lay members, as well as representatives of the Brooklyn Museum, the Metropolitan Museum of Art, the New York Public Library, and the Mayor of New York City. It was renamed by mayor Michael Bloomberg on July 21, 2008 as the Public Design Commission, except where the legal name "Art Commission" is required.

References

External links
 
 Art Commission in the Rules of the City of New York

Public Design Commission